Luisa D'Oliveira (born October 6, 1986) is a Canadian actress who has had roles in 50/50 (2011), Percy Jackson & the Olympians: The Lightning Thief (2010) and Cracked (2013). She is also known for her role as Emori in The CW’s The 100.

Biography 
Born in Vancouver, British Columbia, D'Oliveira acted and performed in several student films in school before attending Capilano University for a full year studying science and then switched to arts for her second year. Afterwards, she returned to acting saying "it just wasn't creative enough for me [I found my way back to acting pretty quickly]".

She has Portuguese, Chinese, French, Scottish and Irish descendencies.

Filmography

Films

Television

Video Games

Awards and nominations

References

External links
 

Canadian film actresses
Living people
Canadian people of Portuguese descent
Canadian actresses of Chinese descent
Canadian television actresses
Actresses from Vancouver
21st-century Canadian actresses
1986 births